Abu Abd Allah Mohammed ibn Mohammed ibn Abd Allah ibn Tijillat al-Hazmiri al-Marrakushi (born in Nafis, near Aghmat fl. 1320) was a Moroccan writer of the 14th century, member of the zawiyya Hazmiriyya and author of Itimid al-aynayn wa-nushat an-nazir in fi manaqib al-ahawayn Abi Zayd wa-Abi Abd Allah al-Hazmiryyayn. This work, written in the beginning of the 14th century, during the reign of the Merinid dynasty is about the Hazmiri saints of Aghmat, father Abd al-Karim, the founder of the aforesaid zawiyya, his wife (passim) and their two sons.

References

Moroccan Sufi writers
14th-century Moroccan people
People from Marrakesh